Marbury is a surname. Notable people with the surname include: 

Anne Marbury Hutchinson (1591–1643), American Puritan spiritual adviser
Charles Clagett Marbury (1898–1991), Justice of the Maryland Court of Appeals
Elisabeth Marbury (1856–1933), American theatrical and literary agent and producer
Francis Marbury (1555–1611), English cleric, schoolmaster, and playwright; father of Anne
Ogle Marbury (1882–1973), American jurist, Chief Judge of the supreme court of Maryland
Stephon Marbury (born 1977), American basketball player
William Marbury (1762–1835), American businessman
Marbury v. Madison, a decision of the United States Supreme Court
William L. Marbury Jr. (1901–1988), American lawyer